William Frederick Lamb  (November 21, 1883 – September 8, 1952), was an American architect, chiefly known as one of the principal designers of the Empire State Building.

Biography
Lamb joined the New York architecture firm Carrère & Hastings in 1911, shortly after returning from Paris, where he earned a diploma at the École des Beaux-Arts.  Lamb became a partner in 1920; the firm would be known as Shreve & Lamb from 1924 to 1929 and thereafter as Shreve, Lamb and Harmon.  Lamb's notable projects include the Empire State Building, the Standard Oil Building, 521 Fifth Avenue, the Forbes Magazine Building, and the General Motors Building in New York City; the Acacia Mutual Life Insurance Building in Washington, D.C.; and academic buildings for the Connecticut College for Women, Williams College, Cornell University, and Wesleyan University.  In addition to his studies at the École des Beaux Arts, Lamb received a bachelor's degree from Williams College in 1904 and did graduate work at the School of Architecture, Columbia University, from 1904 to 1906.  Lamb received an honorary doctorate from Williams College in 1932; other honors include two gold medals from the Fifth Avenue Association (1930, 1931), a medal from the Architectural League of New York (1931), and a medal of honor from the New York Chapter of the American Institute of Architects (1932).  He was a member of the American Academy of Arts and Letters, the Art Commission of the City of New York, the Beaux-Arts Institute of Design, and the Architectural League of New York. In the period preceding the 1939 New York World's fair, Lamb served as "Coordinator of Design" for the fair's board of planners.  Lamb served on the U.S. Commission of Fine Arts from 1937 to 1945, including as vice chairman from 1941 to 1945. In 1942 he was elected into the National Academy of Design as an Associate member and became a full Academician in 1950.

The firm also designed 521 Fifth Avenue, the Forbes Magazine Building, the Standard Oil Building, and the Bankers Trust Building and worked with H. Craig Severance on 40 Wall Street in New York.  He also designed the Reynolds Building in Winston-Salem, North Carolina

He died in New York on September 8, 1952.

References

Bibliography
Tauranac, John. The Empire State Building, St. Martin's Griffin, New York (USA), 1995; pp. 102–4.

External links 
 Structurae
 New York Architecture
 Richmond H. Shreve, William F. Lamb, Arthur L. Harmon and Walter Percy Chrysler. photographed in 1941.

20th-century American architects
1883 births
1952 deaths
Architects from New York City
Columbia Graduate School of Architecture, Planning and Preservation alumni
Williams College alumni
American alumni of the École des Beaux-Arts
Empire State Building
Skyscraper architects
Members of the American Academy of Arts and Letters